Biblioteca Nacional (Spanish or Portuguese: National Library) may refer to:

Biblioteca Nacional de Chile, in Chile
Biblioteca Nacional de España, in Spain
Biblioteca Nacional del Perú, in Peru
Biblioteca Nacional de Portugal, in Portugal
Biblioteca Nacional de la República Argentina, in Argentina
Biblioteca Nacional "Miguel Obregón Lizano", in Costa Rica
Fundação Biblioteca Nacional, in Brazil

See also

List of national and state libraries